The 2017 NCAA Division I women's soccer tournament (semi-finals and final also known as the 2017 Women's College Cup) was the 36th annual single-elimination tournament to determine the national champion of NCAA Division I women's collegiate soccer. The semi-finals and championship game were played at Orlando City Stadium in Orlando, Florida on December 1 and 3, 2017, while the preceding rounds were played at various sites across the country during November 2017. The Stanford Cardinal were tournament champions, winning the final 3–2 over the UCLA Bruins.

Qualification

All Division I women's soccer programs were eligible to qualify for the tournament. 64 teams participated in the tournament. 28 teams qualified automatically by winning their conference tournaments and 3 teams qualified automatically by winning their conference regular-season championship (Ivy League, Pac-12 Conference, and West Coast Conference grant their automatic qualifications to the regular-season champions in lieu of holding a conference tournament). The remaining 33 teams were selected at-large by the NCAA Division I Women's Soccer Committee.

Stanford Bracket

South Carolina Bracket

Duke Bracket

North Carolina Bracket

Bracket 

The bracket was announced on Monday, November 6.

Stanford Bracket 

* Host institution

Schedule

First round

Second round

Round of 16

Quarter-final 

Rankings from United Soccer Coaches Final Regular Season Rankings

South Carolina Bracket 

* Host institution

Schedule

First round

Second round

Round of 16

Quarter-final 

Rankings from United Soccer Coaches Final Regular Season Rankings

Duke Bracket 

* Host institution

Schedule

First round

Second round

Round of 16

Quarter-final 

Rankings from United Soccer Coaches Final Regular Season Rankings

North Carolina Bracket 

* Host institution

Schedule

First round

Second round

Round of 16

Quarter-final 

Rankings from United Soccer Coaches Final Regular Season Rankings

College Cup

Schedule

Semi-finals

Final 

Rankings from United Soccer Coaches Final Regular Season Rankings

Record by conference 

The R32, S16, E8, F4, CG, and NC columns indicate how many teams from each conference were in the Round of 32 (second round), Round of 16 (third round), Quarterfinals, Semi-finals, Final, and National Champion, respectively.
The following conferences received one bid and finished the tournament with a record of 0–1–0: AEC, A-10, ASUN, Big Sky, Big South, Big West, CAA, Horizon, MAAC, MAC, MW, NEC, OVC, Patriot, Southern, Southland, Summit, Sun Belt, SWAC, and WAC.

See also 
 NCAA Women's Soccer Championships (Division II, Division III)
 NCAA Men's Soccer Championships (Division I, Division II, Division III)
 2017 NCAA Division I Men's Soccer Championship

References

NCAA
NCAA Women's Soccer Championship
NCAA Division I Women's Soccer Tournament
NCAA Division I Women's Soccer Tournament
NCAA Division I Women's Soccer Tournament
2017 NCAA Division I women's soccer season